Rodrigue Boucka (born 10 March 1967) is a Gabonese boxer. He competed in the men's featherweight event at the 1992 Summer Olympics.

References

External links
 

1967 births
Living people
Gabonese male boxers
Olympic boxers of Gabon
Boxers at the 1992 Summer Olympics
Place of birth missing (living people)
Featherweight boxers
21st-century Gabonese people